The 2017 Grambling State Tigers football team represented Grambling State University in the 2017 NCAA Division I FCS football season. The Tigers were led by fourth-year head coach Broderick Fobbs and played their home games at Eddie Robinson Stadium in Grambling, Louisiana as members of the West Division of the Southwestern Athletic Conference (SWAC). The Tigers finished the season 11–2, 7–0 in SWAC play to win the West Division. They defeated Alcorn State in the SWAC Championship Game, receiving the conference's bid to the Celebration Bowl where they lost to North Carolina A&T.

Preseason 
The Tigers were picked to finish first in the West Division.

Schedule

Schedule Source:

Ranking movements

References

Grambling State
Grambling State Tigers football seasons
Southwestern Athletic Conference football champion seasons
Grambling State Tigers football